Ricky Leon Aguiar (born 17 March 2001) is an English professional footballer who plays for  Swindon Town as a midfielder.

Career
After playing for Shoreham, Lewes and Worthing, Aguiar signed for Swindon Town in August 2021. He moved on loan to Chippenham Town in October 2021. 

In July 2022, Aguiar extended his contract with Swindon until the summer of 2025.

He moved on loan to Torquay United in January 2023. It was announced on the 2 February 2023 that he had returned to Swindon Town.

Career statistics

References

2001 births
Living people
English footballers
Shoreham F.C. players
Lewes F.C. players
Worthing F.C. players
Swindon Town F.C. players
Chippenham Town F.C. players
Torquay United F.C. players
Isthmian League players
English Football League players
National League (English football) players
Association football midfielders